Aligarh is a town in the Punjab province of Pakistan. It is located at 30°46'25N 72°18'40E with an altitude of 151 metres (498 feet) and is situated in Gojra Tehsil, Toba Tek Singh District.

References

Populated places in Toba Tek Singh District